Mahonia leschenaultii is a plant that belongs to the genus Mahonia. It is indigenous to the temperate and subtropical regions of the Indian sub-continent: Nepal, the Himalayas, Himachal Pradesh, Khasi Hills and the Nilgiri Mountains. In the Nilgiris, it is of religious and medicinal importance to the native Toda people, who call it Thovari.

Description 
Leaves are oblong and have glossy tops; they are positioned botanically opposite. Yellow petaled flowers are borne in two seasons: April through June, and September through November. Small , one-seeded berries are borne about a month after flowering.

Uses 
The Toda people of Tamil Nadu use a paste made of the bark as a Traditional medicine remedy for women immediately after childbirth. The Toda also use a water extracted from the leaves to purify their temples after women have entered them, as women are forbidden from Toda temples.

References 

leschenaultii